Roza Khutor, formerly Krasnaya Polyana is a railway station in Estosadok, Krasnaya Polyana, Sochi, Krasnodar Krai, Russia. This is the terminal station of the railway line which branches off at Adler railway station and was constructed to accommodate the visitors for the 2014 Winter Olympics. The construction started in spring 2010 by NGO Mostovik. The station was open in 2013 as Krasnaya Polyana. In late 2014, it was renamed to Roza Khutor.

References

Railway stations in Sochi
Railway stations in Russia opened in 2013